The 1948–51 Nordic Football Championship was the fifth Nordic Football Championship staged. Four Nordic countries participated: Denmark, Finland, Norway and Sweden. Sweden won the tournament, its third Nordic Championship win. The tournament was arranged by the Danish Football Association and the trophy was named DBU's Vase.

The tournament had three occasions of a team playing two games on the same day, including two times for Sweden and one time for Denmark.

Results

1948

1949

1950

1951

Table 
The table is compiled by awarding two points for a victory, one point for a draw, and no points for a loss.

Winners

Statistics

Goalscorers

See also
Balkan CupBaltic CupCentral European International CupMediterranean Cup

References

Sources 

1948-51
1948–49 in European football
1949–50 in European football
1950–51 in European football
1951–52 in European football
1948–49 in Swedish football
1949–50 in Swedish football
1950–51 in Swedish football
1951–52 in Swedish football
1948–49 in Danish football
1949–50 in Danish football
1950–51 in Danish football
1951–52 in Danish football
1948 in Norwegian football
1949 in Norwegian football
1950 in Norwegian football
1951 in Norwegian football
1948 in Finnish football
1949 in Finnish football
1950 in Finnish football
1951 in Finnish football